Kachalanlu (also Romanized as Kachalānlū; also known as Kachalan) is a village in Sudlaneh Rural District, in the Central District of Quchan County, Razavi Khorasan Province, Iran. At the 2006 census, its population was 687, in 147 families.

References 

Populated places in Quchan County